A Theatre of Timesmiths is a science fiction novel by British writer Garry Kilworth, first published in 1984.

Plot summary
A Theatre of Timesmiths is set in a city trapped behind walls of ice, where the computer which runs its heating is close to failure.

Reception
Dave Langford reviewed A Theatre of Timesmiths for White Dwarf #54, and stated that "This kind of book demands a stream of small revelations en route to the big ones; Kilworth handles this well, concluding with a leap into metaphysics which might have taken me by surprise if I hadn't read too much Ian Watson. Effectively and colourfully written."

Reviews
Review by Chris Morgan (1984) in Fantasy Review, September 1984
Review by Chris Bailey (1984) in Vector 123 
Review by Mary Gentle (1984) in Interzone, #9 Autumn 1984, (1984) 
Review by Richard Law (1985) in Fantasy Review, August 1985 
Review by Tom Easton (1986) in Analog Science Fiction/Science Fact, March 1986 
Review by Carol McGeehon (1986) in Fantasy Review, June 1986

References

1984 British novels